Jose "Kaka" Balagtas is a film director, writer, actor, producer and politician in the Philippines. He previously served as Vice Mayor of San Antonio, Nueva Ecija.

Balagtas is the director of films such as Patron (1988) with Dante Varona, Tupang Itim (1989) with Jess Lapid, Jr., David Balondo ng Tondo (1990) with Ramon Revilla, Magdaleno Orbos: Sa Kuko ng Mga Lawin (1991) with Eddie Garcia, Pat. Omar Abdullah: Pulis Probinsiya (1992) with Phillip Salvador, and Talahib at Rosas (1994) with Cesar Montano.

In 1994, Balagtas won the Best Director Award in the Metro Manila Film Festival for the film Lucas Abelardo starring Roi Vinzon.

He also directed the films Walang Iba Kundi Ikaw (2002) with Mikey Arroyo, Apoy sa Dibdib ng Samar (2006) with Mark Lapid, and Anak ng Kumander (2008) with Manny Pacquiao.

Balagtas produced the films Terrorist Hunter (2005) and Anak ng Kumander (2008).

Filmography

As director

As actor

As writer

References

External links

POLITICALLY-BULLIED VICE MAYOR OF SAN ANTONIO, NUEVA ECIJA KAKA BALAGTAS

Living people
Filipino actor-politicians
Filipino film directors
Filipino film producers
Filipino male film actors
Male actors from Nueva Ecija
National Unity Party (Philippines) politicians
Politicians from Nueva Ecija
Year of birth missing (living people)